This is the list of live performances by the all-girl Filipino idol group MNL48. The group held their first mini concert, MNL48: Christmas Mini Concert 2018 on December 24, 2018, at Movie Stars Cafe, Quezon City. It is their first ever live concert since their debut on April 28, 2018. They also had their first international concert with AKB4 Group, AKB48 Group Asia Festival 2019 in Bangkok on January 27, 2019, at Impact Arena Muang Thong Thani Bangkok, Thailand. On April 6 of the same year, MNL48 held their first major concert, MNL48 First Generation: Living the Dream Concert at New Frontier Theater, Quezon City. On December 20, 2020, the group had their first fundraising concert, KTnX ANG BABAIT NINYO: THE KTX FUNDRAISING CHRISTMAS SPECIAL — P-Pop Rise with P-pop groups Bini, BGYO, and PHP.

Standalone Concerts

MNL48 First Generation: Living the Dream Concert 

On April 6, 2019, MNL48 Held their first major concert at New Frontier Theater, Quezon City, Philippines. This concert featured the first generation members of the group where its tickets were confirmed sold out through their bookings and/or reservations. The show was the first idol concert in the country, and it was directed by GB Sampedro.

Setlist 

 Aitakatta - Gustong Makita
 Tara PARTY 
 Manila48
 First Rabbit (Team MII)
 Labrador Retriever (Team MII)
 1!2!3!4! YOROSHIKU! (Team NIV)
 Palusot Ko'y Maybe (Team NIV)
 Umiindak na Saya (Team L)
 Igai ni Mango (Team L)
 Amazing Grace (MNL48 Gospel Unit)
 365 Araw ng Eroplanong Papel (Senbatsu)
 BINGO! (Senbatsu)
 Heavy Rotation (Senbatsu)
 Aisatsu kara Hajimeyou
 Talulot ng Sakura

Encore 

 Placard ng Aking Puso
 Pag-Ibig Fortune Cookie

MNL48 Team Concert: No To Oshihen! 

This is MNL48's first solo team concerts that was held on October 6, 2019, to October 20, 2019, at Movie Stars Cafe and TIU Theater.

Setlist

Team MII Concert at Movie Stars Cafe on October 6, 2019 

 Fighter (Christina Aguillera cover)
 We Will Rock You (Queen cover)
 First Rabbit
 Labrador Retriever
 Bohemian Rhapsody (Queen cover)
 Last Dance (Donna Summer cover)
 You Can't Stop The Beat (Hairspray cover)
 This is Me (The Greatest Showman cover)
 So long! 
 Ikaw ang Melody
 Aitakatta - Gustong Makita
 365 Araw ng Eroplanong Papel
 Placard ng Aking Puso
 Talulot ng Sakura

Team MII Encore 

 Manila48
 Pag-Ibig Fortune Cookie

Team NIV Concert at Movie Stars Cafe on October 13, 2019 

 1!2!3!4! YOROSHIKU!
 BINGO!
 PARTY ga Hajimaru yo
 Dances Around the World
 Locked Out of Heaven (Bruno Mars Cover)
 Señorita/Let's Get Loud (Camella Cabello/Jennifer Lopez Cover)
 Sumayaw Ka (Gloc9 Cover)
 Sweet But Psycho (Ava Max Cover)
 Fansa (HoneyWorks feat. Mona Cover)
 Scars to Your Beautiful (Alessia Cara Cover)
 Pag-Ibig Fortune Cookie
 365 Araw ng Eroplanong Papel and Ikaw ang Melody Medley (Acoustic version)
 Talulot ng Sakura

Team NIV Encore 

 Palusot Ko'y Maybe 
 Manila48

Team L Concert at TIU Theater on October 20, 2019 

 Igai ni Mango
 PARTY ga Hajimaru yo
 Manila48
 Sugar Rush / Candy
 Nekkoya
 Glass wo Ware!
 Mr. Taxi (SNSD JP ver.)
 Imagine Dragons
 365 Araw ng Eroplanong Papel 
 Umiindak na Saya
 Aitakatta - Gustong Makita
 Pag-Ibig Fortune Cookie
 Dalawang Pag-ibig Niya

Team L Encore 

 Talulot ng Sakura (Acoustic version)
 Aisatsu kara Hajimeyou

MNL48 Christmas Concert: Magical Night of Love 

This concert happened on December 15, 2022, at Music Museum, San Juan. MNL48's overall captain announced her first Solo Song "Tell Me" that was released on December 21st, of the same year.

Setlist 

 RIVER 
 Talulot ng Sakura
 NO WAY MAN
 Labrador Retriever
 Gingham Check
 Ikaw ang Melody
 1!2!3!4! YOROSHIKU! 
 Umiindak na Saya
 BINGO! (Band Version)
 Igai ni Mango (Band Version)
 Palusot Ko'y Maybe (Band Version)
 Santa Tell Me (cover of Ariana Grande)
 Time After Time 
 O Holy Night (Shekinah Arzaga)
 Paskong Kasama ka 
 First Rabbit
 365 Araw ng Eroplanong Papel (Christmas Remix)
 Manila48
 Aitakatta - Gustong Makita
 Pag-Ibig Fortune Cookie

International Concerts

AKB48 Group Asia Festival 2019 in Bangkok 

On December 11, 2018, AKS announced that MNL48 will join the "AKB48 Group Asia Festival 2019" that was held on January 27, 2019, in Bangkok, Thailand at the IMPACT Arena, Muang Thong Thani. The group will perform with their sister groups AKB48, JKT48, BNK48, AKB48 Team SH, AKB48 Team TP and SGO48. MNL48 members Abby, Brei, Coleen, Faith, Gabb, Jem, Mari, Rans, Sela and Sheki went to the event.  it featured MNL48 with AKB48 Group.

MNL48 Mini Concert Setlist 

 Aitakatta - Gustong Makita (Acoustic version)
 Paluost Ko'y Maybe (Acoustic version)
 Pag-Ibig Fortune Cookie (Acoustic version)

MNL48 Main Concert Setlist 

 Tara PARTY
 First Rabbit
 Palusot Ko'y Maybe
 Heavy Rotation (Abby and Sheki with WRD48)
 Blue rose (Shekinah Arzaga with Cindy Yuvia, Punsikorn Tiyakorn (Pun), Võ Phan Kim Khánh) 
 End Roll (Abelaine Trinidad with Mao WeiJia, Shani Indira Natio, Jennis Oprasert)
 Kimi no Koto ga Suki Dakara (with AKB48 Group)
 After Rain (with AKB48 Group)
 Everyday, Kachuusha (with AKB48 Group)
 Sakura no Hanabiratachi (with AKB48 Group)

Encore 

 AKB Festival (with AKB48 Group)
 Koi Suru Fortune Cookie (with AKB48 Group)

AKB48 Group Asia Festival 2019 in Shanghai 

A total of eight members from MNL48 will be flying to Shanghai, China for the AKB48 Group Asia Festival 2019 Shanghai, to be held at the National Exhibition and Convention Center on August 24. They will join AKB48 themselves, AKB48's Team SH and Team TP, and their other international sister groups based in Thailand, Indonesia, and Vietnam. This is the second time MNL48 will be performing abroad, with the first being in the AKB48 Asia Festival in Bangkok last January. Their performance of their a cappella rendition of their single, "365 Araw ng Eroplanong Papel." then went viral on twitter.

MNL48 Mini Concert Setlist 

 Time After Time (Song By Cyndi Lauper)
 Tala
 365 Araw ng Eroplanong (Acapella version)

MNL48 Main Concert Setlist 

 AKB Sanjou! (with AKB48 Group)
 Aitakatta (with AKB48 Group)
 Only Today (with AKB48 Group)
 BINGO! 
 Ikaw ang Melody
 RIVER (Abby and Sheki with WRD48)
 Kimi Dake ni Chu! Chu! Chu! (Rans and Colleen with Oguri Yui, Lin Yu-hsin, Sin Tik-kei, Li ShiQi, and Zhu Ling)
 Kiseki wa Ma ni Awanai (Sheki with Mao WeiJia, and Sachi)
 Confession (Abby with Liu Yu-ching, Shani Indira Natio, and Liu Nian)
 Nante Suteki na Sekai ni Umareta no Darou (with AKB48 Group)
 Honest Man (with AKB48 Group)
 EDM Remix Medley (with AKB48 Group)
 Yuuhi wo Miteiru ka? (with AKB48 Group)

Encore 

 AKB Festival (with AKB48 Group)
 Koi Suru Fortune Cookie (with AKB48 Group)
 Kimi to Niji to Taiyou to (with AKB48 Group)

AKB48 Group Asia Festival 2021 Online

MNL48 Mini Concert Setlist 

 High Tension (Gabrielle Skribikin Center)

MNL48 Main Concert Setlist 

 Aitakatta (with AKB48, AKB48 Team SH, BNK48 and JKT48)
 MC (with AKB48 Group)
 365nichi no Kamihikouki (with AKB48 Group)

Mini Concerts

Collaborative Concerts

PPOPCON 

MNL48 graced the first-ever Pinoy Pop Convention (PPOPCON) in the country, the P-Pop Con 2022. The concert kicked off at the New Frontier Theater on April 9, 2022, while the much-anticipated concert took place in the Big Dome the next day, April 10. Aside from MNL48, other groups that attended the PPOPCON are BGYO, BINI, SB19, Alamat, Press Hit Play, G22, KAIA, VXON, and 4th Impact.

Tugatog: Filipino Music Festival 

On July 15, 2022, A total of 18 P-POP acts including MNL48 joined forces for the first-ever Tugatog: Filipino Music Festival,at the SM Mall of Asia Arena in Pasay City. This music festical was produced by Ant Savvy Creatives, Inc. and co-presented by KUMU, realme, and powered by Ulam Mama. The line-up also includes other P-Pop groups like BGYO, BINI, ALAMAT, PPOP Generation, VXON, LITZ, first.One, Press Hit Play, Dione, Calista, R Rules, G22, DAYDREAM, and YARA. Fifteen members of MNL48 started the music festival as they march their way to the stage and performed their sixth single "River." The group also performed the songs "Pag-ibig Fortune Cookie" and "Ikaw Ang Melody" onstage, and during the group's performance of their song "365 Araw ng Eroplanong Papel", the concert hall was filled with paper plains as fans started flying them on air. MNL48 also collaborated with BGYO and performed a mash-up version of their songs "High Tension" and "Sabay."

MNL48 Setlist 

 River (with BINI and PPop Generation)
 Pag-Ibig Fortune Cookie
 Ikaw ang Melody
 365 Araw ng Eroplanong Papel
 High Tension (with BGYO)

Online Concerts

Live Shows

References 

MNL48
Lists of concert tours
Lists of events in the Philippines